Nodar Khizanishvili (born 31 January 1953 in Batumi, Adjar ASSR) is a retired Soviet football player of Georgian ethnicity. He is the father of Zurab Khizanishvili.

Honours
 Soviet Top League winner: 1978.
 Soviet Cup winner: 1976, 1979.
 UEFA Cup Winners' Cup winner: 1981.

International career
He played his only game for USSR on 14 April 1982 in a friendly against Argentina, coming on for the final eight minutes in place of Leonid Buryak.

References

External links
  Profile

1953 births
Living people
Sportspeople from Batumi
Footballers from Georgia (country)
Soviet footballers
Soviet Union international footballers
FC Dinamo Tbilisi players
FC Dinamo Batumi players
FC Torpedo Kutaisi players
Soviet Top League players
Association football defenders